Tee and Mo is an animated children's television series.  Starting as a series of games and shorts on the CBeebies website in 2013, production of a 50 episode series was ordered in 2014, first airing in 2018.

Plot
This is the story of a monkey mother, Mo, and her three-year-old boy, Tee. Each episode is a story of how they navigate their daily life around the jungle tree. The stories are narrated by radio broadcaster Lauren Laverne in the UK and Caroly Larson in Canada.

Characters
Tee is a three-year-old monkey. He likes to have fun and go on adventures. He cares a lot about his mum, Mo. His favourite toy is a stuffed monkey called Action Ape.

Mo is a monkey and Tee's mother. She is clever and unstoppable.

Episodes

Broadcast

References

External links
 
Tee and Mo CBeebies Page

2018 British television series debuts
2022 British television series endings
CBeebies
BBC children's television shows
Animated television series about children
Animated television series about monkeys
British children's animated adventure television series
British preschool education television series
Canadian children's animated adventure television series
Canadian preschool education television series
2010s British animated television series
2010s Canadian animated television series
2018 Canadian television series debuts
2018 Canadian television series endings
Television series by Banijay
Animated preschool education television series
2010s preschool education television series
Television series by Radical Sheep Productions
English-language television shows